Kıvanç Kasabalı (born 24 February 1975) is a Turkish actor and model.

Kasabalı is a graduate of Uludağ University with a degree in communication studies. After appearing in minor roles, his breakthrough came with Kanal D series Yaprak Dökümü, which was well received by fans and critics. In 2013, he portrayed the character of Sinan in the TV series Merhamet, acting alongside Özgü Namal, İbrahim Çelikkol, Burçin Terzioğlu, Mustafa Üstündağ and Yasemin Allen. In 2014, he was cast in the series Ağlatan Dans, and shared the leading role with Öykü Çelik and Arsen Gürzap.

Filmography

Kaynakça

External links 
 
 

Living people
1975 births
Male actors from Istanbul
Turkish male television actors
Turkish male models
Bursa Uludağ University alumni